London Seaward formerly Leyton Orient Women F.C. (2015-2021) is a women's football team based in Walthamstow, an inner city district in east London in England. The team compete in the FA Women’s National League (fourth tier). The club play home games at the Wadham Lodge Sports Ground in Walthamstow.

History 
The club was founded in 2004 as KIKK United by Andrea Berg and Karin Revelj the team initially used Mile End Stadium as its home ground. 

In 2015 the club was given permission by Leyton Orient FC to use the name Leyton Orient W.F.C. and home games moved to Leyton Orient's Breyer Group Stadium at Brisbane Road, Leyton. The club would compete in the Greater London Women's Football League, in division 1 (North) during this time. Despite the name change the club would continue to be run separately from the mens side. In March 2021 Leyton Orient announced that they were planning to form their own women's side and that the existing team would no longer be able to use the name Leyton Orient WFC. 

As a result of the loss of their ability to compete as Leyton Orient W.F.C. the club was left in search of a new home and identity, with the club settling on the name London Seaward as a reference to the historic connection of London with the sea.

References

External links
Official website

Women's football clubs in London
Year of establishment missing
Sport in Leyton